Henrietta Diana Primrose Longstaff Branford (12 January 1946 – 23 April 1999) was an English author of children's books. Her greatest success was Fire, Bed and Bone (1997), a historical novel set during the English peasants' revolt of 1381. For that she won the Guardian Children's Fiction Prize, a once-in-a-lifetime book award judged by a panel of British children's writers, and she was a highly commended runner up for the Carnegie Medal from the Library Association, recognising the year's best children's book by a British subject.

Biography 
Branford was born in India, and raised in an isolated part of New Forest in Hampshire, where she learned about animals and learned to ride a horse. After living in many other places she moved to Southampton in 1980 with her husband Paul Carter, a photographer, and their three children Jack, Rose and Polly.

Branford had a variety of jobs: as a nanny, in shops, hotels and offices, and for a charity helping elderly people in South London. She trained as a community and youth worker at Goldsmiths' College from 1970 to 1972 but didn't enjoy it. She started writing as a career when she was 40 and in the thirteen years before her death she wrote 25 books for children from toddlers to teens. Her first novel was Royal Blunder. The Fated Sky and Fire, Bed and Bone are two notable others.

Branford was diagnosed with breast cancer in December 1997. Subsequently, she endured chemotherapy and three operations but her cancer was too vigorous to be treated effectively. She died at home in Southampton on 23 April 1999.

Legacy

After her death, two annual awards were created by Julia Eccleshare (Children's Book Editor at The Guardian) and Anne Marley (head of Children's, Youth & Schools Services for Hampshire Library & Information Service). The Branford Boase Award for first time writers commemorates both Branford and her editor Wendy Boase who also died of cancer in 1999. The Henrietta Branford Writing Competition for children was conceived by Branford who did not have time to establish it.

Selected works 
 

 Royal Blunder (1990)
 Royal Blunder and the Haunted House (1990)
 Clare's Summer (1993)
 Dimanche Diller (1994)
 Dimanche Diller in Danger (1994)
 The Theft of Thor's Hammer (1995)
 Nightmare Neighbours (1995)
 Dimanche Diller at Sea (1996)
 Spacebaby (1996)
 The Fated Sky (1996)
 Fire, Bed, and Bone (1997)
 Chance of Safety (1998)
 Myths and Legends (1998)
 White Wolf (1998)
 Prospers Mountain (1999)
 Dipper's Island (1999)
 Ruby Red  (1999)
 Little Pig Figwort (2000 posthumously)

Notes

References

External links 

 Henrietta Branford homepage
 Henrietta Branford Writing Competition homepage
 Henrietta Branford at Walker Books

English children's writers
Guardian Children's Fiction Prize winners
People from New Forest District
English historical novelists
Women historical novelists
Writers of historical fiction set in the Middle Ages
1946 births
1999 deaths